Killinggänget is a Swedish comedy group, started in 1991. It is named after Glenn Killing, a character played by Henrik Schyffert who has appeared in many of their shows. 

The group is notable for their evolution from straight comedy to comedy/drama, a concept they have referred  to as "brown comedy". It has been criticized for its stereotypical portrayal of East Asians.

The Gang
Robert Gustafsson
Jonas Inde - Left in 2004.
Andres Lokko - Writes material but almost never appears on stage/screen. 
Martin Luuk - Writes material but almost never appears on stage/screen.
Johan Rheborg
Henrik Schyffert

Directors
Walter Söderlund (1991-1999)
Tomas Alfredson (2000-today)

Characters 
Glenn Killing, the namesake of the group. Played by Henrik Schyffert, he has appeared in most of their TV shows (along with his boss Percy Nilegård) and also serves as the host for their live performances.
Percy Nilegård, played by Johan Rheborg. A vain, snobbish, and possibly insane capitalist with a noticeable underbite, he does almost everything to earn money while also promoting his own ideas of good taste which usually involve a conservative and racist view of society.
Tommy Bohlin, played by Jonas Inde. A simple and somewhat dim-witted heavy metal fan, he usually plays the part of assistant to more important characters.
Farbror Barbro (Uncle Barbro), played by Johan Rheborg. A guidance counselor (presumably male, despite having a female name) who tends to ignore actual problems in favor of marketing hi-fi equipment.
Weiron, played by Robert Gustafsson. A stereotype of a socialist blue collar worker from Gothenburg, He hosts his own early morning show on Nilecity 105,6 where he pesters people trying to sleep.
Fred Asp, played by Robert Gustafsson. A drunk who has made an act out of "partying" with his stuffed ferret Göran.

Productions

TV productions
1992 - I manegen med Glenn Killing
1995 - Nilecity 105,6
1996 - Percy tårar
1999 - Fyra små filmer: Gunnar Rehlin, Ben & Gunnar, På sista versen and Screwed in Tallinn

On stage
1995 - I manegen med Glenn Killing - Live från Berns
2000 - Glenn Killing på Grand

Cinema
2004 - Four Shades of Brown

Internet
Spermaharen

References

External links 
Killinggänget at svt.se (Swedish television)

Swedish comedy troupes